Năsăud (Nußdorf) is a town in Bistrița-Năsăud County in Romania located in the historical region of Transylvania. The town administers two villages, Liviu Rebreanu (until 1958 Prislop; Priszlop) and Lușca (Szamospart). At the 2011 census, 93.6% of inhabitants were Romanians, 5.5% Roma, and 0.6% Hungarians.

Geography
The town lies on the Transylvanian Plateau, on the right bank of the Someșul Mare River.

History

The name Năsăud is possibly derived from the Slavic nas voda, meaning "near the water". Another etymology is from Nußdorf (Nussdorf, "walnut tree village"), the Transylvanian Saxon name of the town during the Middle Ages. 

A former Habsburg border town known for its border regiments with panache and good schools, Năsăud saw industrial expansion during the communist era and industrial collapse after the Romanian Revolution of 1989. 

Năsăud still has a few late 18th and early 19th century buildings left standing. Most remarkable in this regard is the local Romanian Greek Catholic church and the former military headquarters of the Habsburg era military regiment, now a museum. Although the town hall is located in its midst, the 19th century center of the town has been left to decay. Since 2012 the municipality has begun to restore the buildings in the old city center. The town hall saw a complete restoration and expansion in 2013.

Economy
Local economic activity revolves around the remittance economy generated by massive outmigration to Spain and Italy during the early 2000s, although the largest industrial employers in textiles and chemicals have been rejuvenated by European Union membership.

The economic upturn of the mid-2000s has translated into a better city life and infrastructure improvements. Most notable in this regard are the refurbishing of the old military headquarters (now a museum), improved roads and more bar/restaurant options. Two new restaurants (Geea and La Borșanu) are popular in town.

Education
The town is the home of the George Coșbuc National College.

Natives
Tudor Bompa (born 1932), sports scientist, professor at York University
Joel Brand (1906–1964), member of the Budapest Aid and Rescue Committee  during the Holocaust
Nicolae Bretan (1887–1968), opera composer, baritone, conductor, and music critic
Vasile Dîncu (born 1961), politician
Tudor Drăganu (1912–2010), jurist
Sergiu Homei (born 1987), footballer
Veronica Micle (1850–1889), poet, best known for her love affair with Mihai Eminescu
Constantin C. Moisil (1876–1958), archivist, historian, numismatist, and schoolteacher
Iuliu Moisil (1859–1947), schoolteacher and non-fiction writer
Sandu Negrean (born 1974), footballer
 (born 1962), writer
 (1831–1908), officer in the Austrian Imperial Army

Photo gallery

Notes

Populated places in Bistrița-Năsăud County
Localities in Transylvania
Towns in Romania